Thout 3 - Coptic Calendar - Thout 5

The fourth day of the Coptic month of Thout, the first month of the Coptic year. On a common year, this day corresponds to September 1, of the Julian Calendar, and September 14, of the Gregorian Calendar. This day falls in the Coptic season of Akhet, the season of inundation.

Commemorations

Feasts 

 Coptic New Year Period

Saints 
 The commemoration of Joshua the son of Nun
 The departure of Pope Macarius II, the sixty-ninth Patriarch of the See of Saint Mark
 The departure of Saint Verena

References 

Days of the Coptic calendar